The New Caledonian rail (Cabalus lafresnayanus) is a large and drab flightless rail that is found on the island of New Caledonia in the Pacific. It is a dull brown above, with grey underparts, and has a yellowish, downward-curving bill. No one knows what it sounds like and it is not known whether it is nocturnal or crepuscular.

It most likely was driven to extinction from predation by feral cats, dogs, and pigs.

Status
 
This cryptic rail is only known from seventeen specimens taken between 1860 and 1890 on New Caledonia. This bird is supposed to live in evergreen forests and seems to have moved higher up on the island to escape introduced predators. Its diet consists of invertebrates, including earthworms.

Though the bird has not been confirmed since 1890, unconfirmed reports from the 1960s and 1984 say that some still live in the higher montane forests. A survey in 1998 produced no firm evidence from hunters or fieldwork. However, many still believe it persists in small numbers.

This bird was host to a species of parasite, the phtilopterid louse Rallicola piageti. This is not believed to have occurred on any other bird species . Hence, R. piageti may be coextinct today (May 1990).

The binomial commemorates the French ornithologist Frederic de Lafresnaye.

References

Mey, Eberhard (1990): Eine neue ausgestorbene Vogel-Ischnozere von Neuseeland, Huiacola extinctus (Insecta, Phthiraptera). Zoologischer Anzeiger 224(1/2): 49–73. [German with English abstract] PDF fulltext

External links

BirdLife Species Factsheet.

Cabalus
Endemic birds of New Caledonia
Critically endangered fauna of Oceania
Extinct flightless birds
Birds described in 1860
Taxobox binomials not recognized by IUCN